The International Opera Awards is an annual awards ceremony honouring excellence in opera around the world.

Origins 
The International Opera Awards was founded in 2013 by Harry Hyman, a UK businessman, philanthropist and supporter of opera, and John Allison, Editor of Opera Magazine. The aim of the event is to celebrate excellence in opera and to raise the profile of opera as an artform internationally.

Award categories 
Awards are given in approximately 20 categories each year. Nominations for all categories are open to the general public, who submit their choices via an online form. Long lists generated by this process are subsequently considered by a jury of opera critics and administrators, who announce shortlists ahead of the ceremony.

Winners are determined by secret ballot, with the exception of the Opera Magazine Readers' Award, which is decided by public vote.

Ceremony 
The inaugural international Opera Awards were held in London at The Hilton Hotel on Monday 22 April 2013. Subsequent ceremonies have taken place each year in April or May.

In 2015 the Awards switched from a dinner format to a theatre show, featuring performances by past winners, finalists and other prominent operatic performers. The 2015 and 2016 ceremonies took place at the Savoy Theatre in London. Since 2017 the ceremony has been held at the London Coliseum and Sadler's Wells Theatre, with Orpheus Sinfonia as the orchestra of the Awards. 

The host of the Awards for the past two years has been the BBC Radio 3 presenter Petroc Trelawny. The director has been Ella Marchment.

Charitable aims 
The Awards raise money for The Opera Awards Foundation, a charity which awards bursaries to aspiring operatic artists in financial need. Recipients include singers, conductors, accompanists, directors and ensembles. Applications are accepted annually and are open to artists in any country.

Award winners

References

External links

2013 establishments in the United Kingdom
Opera in the United Kingdom
Classical music awards
Awards established in 2013